Kosmos 57 ( meaning Cosmos 57) was an unmanned Soviet spacecraft launched on 22 February 1965. The craft was essentially an unmanned version of Voskhod 2. Its primary mission was to test the Volga airlock. The test was successful, but the craft was lost shortly after. The spaceflight is designated under the Kosmos system, placing it with many other Soviet scientific and military satellites.

Mission 
The unmanned craft was launched three weeks before Voskhod 2. The primary objective of Voskhod 2 was to conduct a spacewalk, which relied on the inflatable Volga airlock. Kosmos 57 was to test the performance of the airlock. The airlock opened and closed successfully and the craft was re-pressurized without flaw.

Destruction 
The unmanned spacecraft was destroyed on its third orbit around Earth. Two ground stations, one in Klyuchi and the other in Yelizovo, sent simultaneous commands, instead of sequentially as planned, instructing the craft to depressurize its airlock. The craft interpreted this as an order to begin the descent and a propulsion error put the craft into a tumble. Approximately twenty-nine minutes later, the craft's automatic self-destruct function activated. The craft was completely destroyed to prevent sensitive information from literally falling into enemy hands. Over 100 pieces of the spacecraft were tracked, falling into the ocean between 31 March and 6 April 1965. No other test or backup spacecraft was built with an EVA port. The decision was made to go ahead with Voskhod 2 anyway, due to a one-year lead time to construct a replacement. Planned follow-on Voskhod missions were cancelled, including the Soviet Air Force version, long-duration one-man flight.

See also 

 List of Kosmos satellites
  Overview at Encyclopaedia britannica
 Spacecraft launches in 1965, Overview

References 

Earth observation satellites of the Soviet Union
Voskhod program
Spacecraft launched in 1965
1965 in the Soviet Union